Chediak is a surname. Notable people with the surname include:

Almir Chediak (1950–2003), Brazilian musical producer, entrepreneur, publisher, guitarist, teacher, composer, writer and researcher
Braz Chediak (born 1942), Brazilian actor, screenwriter and filmmaker
Enrique Chediak (born 1967), Ecuadorian cinematographer
Jesus Chediak (d. 2020), Brazilian film producer and theatre director
Jorge Chediak (born 1951), Uruguayan lawyer and judge